Abadan is a city in southwestern Iran on the Persian Gulf.

Abadan may also refer to:

Abadan-Ayatollah Jami International Airport, airport of the city of Abadan, Iran
Abadan County, an administrative subdivision in Khuzestan Province of Iran
Abadan Crisis (between 1951 and 1954), a crisis that occurred after Iran nationalized oil refineries
Abadan Crisis timeline
Abadan Refinery, an oil refinery in Iran, built in 1912
Abadan Industrial Estate
Abadan Island
Abadan, Isfahan, a village in Isfahan Province, Iran
Abadan, Markazi, a village in Markazi Province, Iran
Abadan-e Hoseyni, a village in Kerman Province, Iran
Abadan, Sistan and Baluchestan, a village in Sistan and Baluchestan Province, Iran
Abadan, Turkmenistan, a city in southern Turkmenistan
Abadan, Çubuk, a village in the district of Çubuk, Ankara Province, Turkey
Abadan (film), a 2003 drama film by Iranian filmmaker Mani Haghighi
MT Abadan, a coastal tanker built in 1945 and scrapped in 1969
Abadan, Jalandhar, a village in the Indian state of Punjab
Kazi Magomed – Astara – Abadan pipeline, a natural gas pipeline from Kazi Magomed in Azerbaijan to Iran
Sanat Naft Abadan FC, Iranian football club based in Abadan
Sanat Naft Novin Abadan F.C., Iranian football club based in Abadan
Siege of Abadan (1980), a major action during the early part of the Iran–Iraq War

People
Ayşegül Abadan (born 1980), Turkish pianist
Oğuz Abadan (born 1950), Turkish musician
Nermin Abadan Unat (born 1921), Turkish lawyer